= Kūpolō, Hawaii =

Coordinates: 21°57′59″N 159°21′35″W

Kūpolō is a populated place in south-east Kauai in the Hawaiian Islands.
